Dan Nguyen Luong (born 8 December 1991) is a German field hockey player who plays as a midfielder for Mannheimer HC and the German national team.

International career
Nguyen made his debut for the national team in January 2014. In November 2018, he was selected in the Germany squad for the 2018 World Cup. He also represented Germany at the 2019 European Championship.

References

External links

1991 births
Living people
German male field hockey players
Male field hockey midfielders
2018 Men's Hockey World Cup players
Der Club an der Alster players
Mannheimer HC players
Place of birth missing (living people)
Men's Feldhockey Bundesliga players
21st-century German people